The Dwarka Sector 8 Metro Station is located on the Blue Line of the Delhi Metro. This station was built as an extension to Dwarka Sector 21 in order to serve Dwarka residents better and provide interchange with the Delhi Airport Express. The station was inaugurated on 30 October 2010, after the completion of successful trials and approval from the railway inspector.

The station

Station layout

Facilities
List of available ATM at Dwarka Sector 8 metro station: Canara Bank.

See also

Delhi
List of Delhi Metro stations
Transport in Delhi
Delhi Metro Rail Corporation
Delhi Suburban Railway
Delhi Monorail
Delhi Transport Corporation
West Delhi
New Delhi
Dwarka, Delhi
National Capital Region (India)
List of rapid transit systems
List of metro systems

References

External links

 Delhi Metro Rail Corporation Ltd. (Official site) 
 Delhi Metro Annual Reports
 
 UrbanRail.Net – descriptions of all metro systems in the world, each with a schematic map showing all stations.

Delhi Metro stations
Railway stations opened in 2010
Railway stations in South West Delhi district